John Stephen Klotz (December 5, 1932 – May 22, 2020) was an American football player who played with the New York Titans, San Diego Chargers, New York Jets, and Houston Oilers. He played college football at Widener University.

He died on May 22, 2020, in Springfield, Pennsylvania at age 87.

References

1932 births
2020 deaths
American football tackles
Widener Pride football players
New York Titans (AFL) players
San Diego Chargers players
New York Jets players
Houston Oilers players
Players of American football from Pennsylvania
Sportspeople from Chester, Pennsylvania
American Football League players